Sunderland City are a rugby league team based in Sunderland, Tyne and Wear. They play in the North East Premier division of the Rugby League Conference.

History
Sunderland City joined the newly created North East Division of the Rugby League Conference in the 2001 season.

They joined the new North Premier Division for 2005 but dropped down to the North Division in 2006 competing as Sunderland Nissan.

They returned to the North Premier Division for the 2007 and 2008 summer seasons but in 2009 the North Premier was divided into the North West Premier and the Yorkshire Premier and Sunderland joined the North East Division again reverting to Sunderland City.

Sunderland joined the newly formed North East Premier in 2011.

Rugby League Conference teams
Rugby league teams in Tyne and Wear
Rugby clubs established in 1980